Barthélémy Ngatsono is a Congolese football manager.

He was appointed as the Congo national football team manager in December 2016 following the sacking of Pierre Lechantre.

References

Living people
Congo national football team managers
Year of birth missing (living people)
Republic of the Congo football managers
21st-century Democratic Republic of the Congo people